Christian Salem (born 15 July 1995) is a professional Australian rules footballer playing for the Melbourne Football Club in the Australian Football League (AFL). He was recognised as a talented footballer at a young age when he represented Victoria at under 12 level. He played top-level football early when he played in both the TAC Cup and AFL Under 18 Championships as a bottom-aged player. His achievements as a junior saw him selected with the ninth pick in the 2013 AFL draft by the Melbourne Football Club and he made his AFL debut during the 2014 season.

Early life
Salem was born to Alex and Mary Salem, and is of Lebanese descent with his father being born in Lebanon. His talent was recognised from a young age when he received state selection in the under-12 Victorian side. He attended Brighton Grammar and played with the Robert Shaw coached first XVIIIs side from year nine, generally playing against year twelves.

Salem played his junior career with the Hampton Rovers Football Club and played for the Sandringham Dragons in the TAC Cup in both 2012 and 2013. He was selected to play for Victoria Metro in the 2012 AFL Under 18 Championships as a bottom-aged player and played in the winning final, kicking two goals. He received a scholarship through the AIS-AFL Academy as part of their level two squad in the 2012 intake, and travelled to Europe for two weeks in 2013. He received mid-year state honours for the second consecutive year and played for Victoria Metro in the 2013 AFL Under 18 Championships.

Salem was rated highly heading into the 2013 AFL draft and was predicted to be drafted inside the top ten due to his decision making and kicking precision, in addition, he drew comparisons to Luke Hodge, Nick Dal Santo and Dan Hannebery.

AFL career

Salem was recruited by the Melbourne Football Club with their first selection and ninth overall in the 2013 national draft. During the pre-season, he suffered from a thyroid issue which saw him lose six kilograms in the month following the draft. He played the start of the season in the Victorian Football League (VFL)  for Melbourne's affiliate team, the Casey Scorpions, and after strong form in the VFL, including a thirty-two possession game in the VFL round three match against  at Frankston Park, he made his AFL debut a week later in the thirty-one point loss against  at the Melbourne Cricket Ground in round six. In his seventh match, Salem was pivotal in Melbourne's comeback victory against  in round thirteen, after marking the ball thirty metres directly in front of goal, he kicked the winning goal with nineteen seconds left in the match, giving Melbourne a one-point lead. He finished his debut season with twelve matches and senior Herald Sun football writer, Jay Clark, wrote he had the potential to become one of Melbourne's best players.

After playing his debut season in the forward line and a majority of matches as the substitute, Salem changed positions in 2015 and played predominantly on the half-back line. He played the remainder of the season and finished with ten matches overall.

After declaring his intentions to play in the midfield, Salem retained his spot on the half-back line whilst also playing on the wing and prior to the season, he was labelled as one of the players who could have a breakout season by AFL Media journalist, Ben Guthrie. Entrusted with the kick-ins for the season due to his elite kicking skills, Salem played the first six matches of the season before suffering from a concussion as a result of a head clash during the thirty-nine point loss against  at Etihad Stadium in round six. After being omitted the next week and playing for Casey in the VFL, a recurrence of his thyroid issue would see him miss two months of any form of football, and he returned for Casey when he played against  in round seventeen of the VFL season. After playing the next three weeks in the VFL, he returned to the senior side for the final match of the year in the 111-point loss against  at Simonds Stadium, which saw him finish with eight matches for the season. His time in the VFL saw him qualify for the finals, and he played in the winning preliminary final against  in which he was stretchered off in the second quarter after losing consciousness from a tackle where his head hit the ground heavily.

During the 2017 preseason, senior coach, Simon Goodwin, earmarked a move into the midfield for Salem in the upcoming season, however, he suffered a mishap during preseason training, in which he received his third concussion in 2016 due to a brick in his backpack hitting his head during a preseason camp in December. Despite the injury, he returned to full fitness in time for the start of the season and played in the opening round match against St Kilda at Etihad Stadium. The next week in the twenty-two point win against Carlton at the Melbourne Cricket Ground, he recorded a career-high thirty-one disposals, in addition to seven marks, seven rebound 50s, three tackles and a goal, to be named the best player on the field by AFL Media journalist, Ben Collins. In what was labelled his breakthrough game by Herald Sun reporter, Jay Clark, he received the maximum three Brownlow Medal votes, meaning he was adjudged the best player on the ground by the field umpires. 

Salem played the first nine matches of the season, until he was suspended for the round ten match against  at TIO Traeger Park due to striking 's, Shaun Higgins, in the fourteen point loss the week before. He received high praise from the media during the first half of the season, with The Age journalist, Chloe Saltau, writing Salem's "polish and calm" was a key reason behind Melbourne's improved form, Fox Sport Australia's, Anna Harington, noted he was enjoying a breakout season and his elite kicking was a "valuable asset" to Melbourne, and AFL Media reporter, Ben Guthrie, reiterated by stating his "elite ball use and composure under pressure [was] proving to be an important component of Melbourne's side." Furthermore, he was named in AFL Media's team of the week for his performances in the round two match against Carlton and the round thirteen match against the Western Bulldogs. 

Missing just the one match from rounds one to fourteen, Salem was forced to miss four weeks of football after sustaining a hamstring injury during the three-point win against  at Domain Stadium in round fourteen. He returned for the twenty-three point win against  at the Melbourne Cricket Ground in round eighteen, and played three matches before he was omitted for the round twenty-one match against St Kilda at the Melbourne Cricket Ground. The same weekend when he was playing in the VFL, he was suspended for one week for striking Carlton forward, Liam Sumner, thus ruling him ineligible for selection for the round twenty-two match against . He returned for the final round match against  at the Melbourne Cricket Ground and finished with sixteen matches for the season.

Statistics
Updated to the end of round 1, 2023.

|-
| 2014 ||  || 3
| 12 || 6 || 6 || 57 || 24 || 81 || 24 || 22 || 0.5 || 0.5 || 4.8 || 2.0 || 6.8 || 2.0 || 1.8 || 0
|- 
| 2015 ||  || 3
| 10 || 1 || 3 || 101 || 57 || 158 || 34 || 35 || 0.1 || 0.3 || 10.1 || 5.7 || 15.8 || 3.4 || 3.5 || 0
|-
| 2016 ||  || 3
| 8 || 1 || 0 || 87 || 59 || 146 || 17 || 29 || 0.1 || 0.0 || 10.9 || 7.4 || 18.3 || 2.1 || 3.6 || 0
|- 
| 2017 ||  || 3
| 16 || 5 || 0 || 219 || 124 || 343 || 73 || 54 || 0.3 || 0.0 || 13.7 || 7.8 || 21.5 || 4.6 || 3.4 || 3
|-
| 2018 ||  || 3
| 24 || 6 || 7 || 320 || 174 || 494 || 85 || 84 || 0.3 || 0.2 || 13.3 || 7.3 || 20.6 || 3.5 || 3.5 || 2
|- 
| 2019 ||  || 3
| 20 || 0 || 2 || 334 || 148 || 482 || 93 || 60 || 0.0 || 0.1 || 16.7 || 7.4 || 24.1 || 4.7 || 3.0 || 0
|-
| 2020 ||  || 3
| 16 || 2 || 0 || 200 || 101 || 301 || 64 || 41 || 0.1 || 0.0 || 12.5 || 6.3 || 18.8 || 4.0 || 2.6 || 0
|- 
| scope=row bgcolor=F0E68C | 2021# ||  || 3
| 24 || 3 || 2 || 405 || 203 || 608 || 145 || 58 || 0.1 || 0.1 || 16.9 || 8.5 || 25.3 || 6.0 || 2.4 || 1
|-
| 2022 ||  || 3
| 13 || 1 || 1 || 148 || 78 || 226 || 59 || 37 || 0.1 || 0.1 || 11.4 || 6.0 || 17.4 || 4.5 || 2.8 || 0
|- 
| 2023 ||  || 3
| 0 || – || – || – || – || – || – || – || – || – || – || – || – || – || – || –
|- class=sortbottom
! colspan=3 | Career
! 143 !! 25 !! 21 !! 1871 !! 968 !! 2839 !! 594 !! 420 !! 0.2 !! 0.1 !! 13.1 !! 6.8 !! 19.9 !! 4.2 !! 2.9 || 6
|}

Notes

Honours and achievements
Team
 AFL premiership player: 2021
 McClelland Trophy: 2021

Other work
Due to his Lebanese background, he was named one of the AFL's multicultural ambassadors during the 2017 season.

References

External links

Christian Salem's profile from Demonwiki

1995 births
Living people
People educated at Brighton Grammar School
Melbourne Football Club players
Casey Demons players
Sandringham Dragons players
Australian rules footballers from Victoria (Australia)
Australian people of Lebanese descent
Melbourne Football Club Premiership players
One-time VFL/AFL Premiership players